Asthenodipsas is a genus of snakes of the family Pareidae.

Species
 Asthenodipsas borneensis Quah, Grismer, Lim, Anuar, & Chan, 2020 – Bornean dark-necked slug snake 
Asthenodipsas ingeri  
 Asthenodipsas jamilinaisi Quah, Grismer, Lim, Anuar, & Imbun, 2019
 Asthenodipsas laevis (Boie, 1827)
 Asthenodipsas lasgalenensis Loredo, Wood, Quah, Anuar, Greer, Ahmad & Grismer, 2013
 Asthenodipsas malaccanus Peters, 1864
 Asthenodipsas stuebingi Quah, Grismer, Lim, Anuar, & Imbun, 2019
 Asthenodipsas tropidonotus (Lidth De Jeude, 1923)
 Asthenodipsas vertebralis (Boulenger, 1900)

References 

Pareidae
Snake genera
Taxa named by Wilhelm Peters